Arturo García Rodríguez (8 May 1908 – 3 November 1973), known professionally as Arturo de Córdova, was a Mexican actor who appeared in over a hundred films.

Biography

Career
Arturo García Rodríguez was born in Mérida, Yucatán on 8 May 1908. Most of Córdova's films were made in Mexico and he became a major motion picture actor in Latin America and Spain, winning three Silver Ariels and received four other nominations. Córdova starred in several American films during the 1940s including For Whom the Bell Tolls (1943), Frenchman's Creek (1944), Incendiary Blonde (1945), and New Orleans (1947).

Personal life and death
He was married to Enna de Arana and in a relationship with actress Marga López from 1964 until his death. Córdova died from a stroke in Mexico City in 1973. His grandson is producer Álex García.

Filmography

Awards and nominations

References

External links
 
 

1908 births
1978 deaths
20th-century Mexican male actors
Best Actor Ariel Award winners
Mexican male film actors
Male actors from Yucatán (state)
People from Mérida, Yucatán